

Shakey's V-League Seasons

2004-2016

Premier Volleyball League Seasons

References